Wino may refer to:
 WINO (band), a Japanese rock band
 WINO (FM), a radio station (91.9 FM) licensed to serve Wakins Glen, New York, United States
 WRFI (FM), a radio station (89.7 FM) licensed to serve Odessa, New York, which held the call sign WINO from 2009 to 2022
 Wino (particle), hypothetical superpartners of W bosons
 Scott "Wino" Weinrich (born 1961), guitarist and vocalist
An alcoholic who prefers wine